Various polling organisations have been conducting opinion polling in specific ridings in the lead up to the 2015 Canadian general election. The results of publicised opinion polling for individual constituencies are detailed in this article.

Opinion polls have been conducted from the months following the previous general election held in May 2011, and have increased in frequency leading up to the general election.

Given the expense of polling individual constituencies, constituencies are usually only polled if they are of some particular interest, e.g. they are thought to be marginal or facing an impending by-election. The constituencies polled are not necessarily representative of a national average swing. Under the first-past-the-post electoral system the true marginal seats, by definition, will be decisive as to the outcome of the election.

A total of 204 polls in 107 ridings across 9 provinces and 1 territory were conducted.

Constituency polls

Alberta

Calgary Centre

Calgary Confederation

Edmonton Centre

Edmonton Griesbach

Edmonton Manning

Edmonton Mill Woods

Edmonton Riverbend

Edmonton West

Fort McMurray—Cold Lake

Lethbridge

St. Albert—Edmonton

Yellowhead

British Columbia

Burnaby North—Seymour

Cariboo—Prince George

Coquitlam—Port Coquitlam

Courtenay—Alberni

Cowichan—Malahat—Langford

Esquimalt—Saanich—Sooke

Fleetwood—Port Kells

Kootenay—Columbia

Nanaimo—Ladysmith

North Island—Powell River

North Okanagan—Shuswap

North Vancouver

Pitt Meadows—Maple Ridge

Port Moody—Coquitlam

South Okanagan—West Kootenay

Vancouver Granville

Vancouver South

West Vancouver—Sunshine Coast—Sea to Sky Country

Manitoba

Elmwood—Transcona

Saint Boniface—Saint Vital

Winnipeg South Centre

New Brunswick

Fredericton

Saint John—Rothesay

Newfoundland and Labrador

Avalon

Nova Scotia

Central Nova

Cumberland—Colchester

Ontario

Ajax

Algoma—Manitoulin—Kapuskasing

Brampton Centre

Brampton East

Brampton North

Brampton South

Brampton West

Brantford—Brant

Bruce—Grey—Owen Sound

Cambridge

Chatham-Kent—Leamington

Don Valley West

Eglinton—Lawrence

Essex

Etobicoke Centre

Etobicoke—Lakeshore

Flamborough—Glanbrook

Guelph

Hamilton West—Ancaster—Dundas

Kanata—Carleton

Kenora

Kingston and the Islands

Kitchener Centre

London North Centre

London West

Markham—Stouffville

Mississauga Centre

Mississauga East—Cooksville

Mississauga—Erin Mills

Mississauga—Lakeshore

Mississauga—Malton

Mississauga—Streetsville

Nepean

Niagara Falls

Nickel Belt

Nipissing—Timiskaming

Oakville North—Burlington

Orléans

Ottawa Centre

Ottawa West—Nepean

Perth—Wellington

Peterborough—Kawartha

Sault Ste. Marie

Scarborough Centre

Scarborough Southwest

Spadina—Fort York

Sudbury

Timmins—James Bay

Toronto Centre

University—Rosedale

Waterloo

Willowdale

Windsor West

York Centre

Quebec

Ahuntsic-Cartierville

Chicoutimi—Le Fjord

Jonquière

Lac-Saint-Jean

Laurier—Sainte-Marie

Montarville

Mount Royal

Notre-Dame-de-Grâce—Westmount

Papineau

Pontiac

Richmond—Arthabaska

Saskatchewan

Regina—Lewvan

Saskatoon—University

Saskatoon West

Yukon

Yukon

See also
Opinion polling in the Canadian federal election, 2015

Notes
Notes
 In cases when linked poll details distinguish between the margin of error associated with the total sample of respondents (including undecided and non-voters) and that of the subsample of decided/leaning voters, the latter is included in the table.  Also not included is the margin of error created by rounding to the nearest whole number or any margin of error from methodological sources. Most online polls—because of their opt-in method of recruiting panellists which results in a non-random sample—cannot have a margin of error. In such cases, shown is what the margin of error would be for a survey using a random probability-based sample of equivalent size.
 Refers to the total sample size, including undecided and non-voters.
 "Telephone" refers to traditional telephone polls conducted by live interviewers; "IVR" refers to automated Interactive Voice Response polls conducted by telephone; "online" refers to polls conducted exclusively over the internet; "telephone/online" refers to polls which combine results from both telephone and online surveys, or for which respondents are initially recruited by telephone and then asked to complete an online survey.
 Election Results shown for 2011 are the redistributed results for the 2015 districts.  These are fixed until 2023 under the present federal electoral system.  About 80% of the 308 districts defined in 2003 changed their borders or are entirely new:  338 districts were defined in 2015.

References

2015
2015 Canadian federal election
Canada